Grain Pole Hill is a location on Anglezarke Moor, within the West Pennine Moors of Lancashire, England.  Despite a modest height of 285 metres (935 ft), the summit provides excellent views towards the Irish Sea.  It is located between Round Loaf and Pikestones, both of which are Neolithic remnants.  Hurst Hill is less than half a mile away.

It is uncertain as to when the hill gained its name.

Notes and references

External links
 Photographs of, and from, the summit

Geography of Chorley
Hills of the West Pennine Moors
Mountains and hills of Lancashire